Matthew Innes is a British academic who is Vice Master and Professor of History at Birkbeck College, University of London.

Honours and awards

 The Philip Leverhulme Prize for Outstanding Research (2004)
 The Royal Historical Society's Gladstone History Book Prize (2000)

Selected publications
 "Memory, orality and literacy in an early medieval society", Past and Present, 158, pp. 3–36. (1998)

References

Academics of Birkbeck, University of London
Living people
Year of birth missing (living people)
Fellows of the Royal Historical Society